A Very Moral Night is a 1977 Hungarian comedy film directed by Károly Makk. It was entered into the 1978 Cannes Film Festival.

Cast
 Margit Makay - Aunt Kelepei
 Irén Psota - Mutter
 Carla Romanelli - Bella
 Georgiana Tarjan - Darinka (as Györgyi Tarján)
 György Cserhalmi - Jenő Kelepei
 Edith Leyrer - Nusika
 Mari Kiss - Rózsi
 Ildikó Kishonti - Karolina
 Zsuzsa Mányai - Girl
 Edit Soós - Girl
 Katalin Szécsi - Girl
 Ági Szirtes - Servant-maid
 Judit Törő - Girl
 András Ambrus - Major
 Lajos Balázsovits - Szabó
 Zoltán Basilides - Tivadar
 Zoltán Benkóczy - Chief Hunter
 Gyula Benkő - Deputy Homoródy
 László Csákányi - Mr. Kautsky

References

External links

1977 films
1970s Hungarian-language films
1977 comedy films
Films directed by Károly Makk
Hungarian comedy films